Megachile picicornis is a species of bee in the family Megachilidae. It was described by Morawitz in 1853.

References

Picicornis
Insects described in 1853